Dignitary Protection services are most often provided by either the United States Secret Service or the US Department of State’s Diplomatic Security Service. Contrary to other VIP close protection full-time jobs, dignitary protection most often is a temporary assignment, security detail is usually required to interact with foreign protective security officers, who come along with dignitaries.

Secret Service
In addition to US government protectees (the president and other members of the Cabinet), the Secret Service protects visiting heads of state.

Diplomatic Security Service (DSS)
In addition to US government protectees (the Secretary of State, the ambassador to the United Nations), the Diplomatic Security Service (DSS) protects foreign dignitaries who are not heads of state, essentially everyone else.

In recent years DSS agents have also protected foreign leaders in their own country. This includes the president of Liberia, and the president of Afghanistan.

See also 

 Executive protection, similar role in the private sector

References
 USSS How Protection Works page
 State Department links to photos of DS Agents protecting dignitaries

Law enforcement techniques